The Distinguished Civilian Service Award is the highest honorary award of the United States Defense Contract Management Agency (DCMA). The award consists of a gold medal, lapel pin and certificate.

The award can be made to civilian employees of DCMA.

References

Awards and decorations of the United States Department of Defense